Prosopocera viridegrisea is a species of beetle in the family Cerambycidae. It was described by Hintz in 1911. It is known from Kenya, the Democratic Republic of the Congo, and Gabon.

Subspecies
 Prosopocera viridegrisea kenyana Breuning, 1958
 Prosopocera viridegrisea viridegrisea Hintz, 1911

References

Prosopocerini
Beetles described in 1911